Streptanthus glandulosus is a species of flowering plant in the mustard family known by the common name bristly jewelflower. It is native to California and southwestern Oregon, where it grows in many types of habitat, including grassland, chaparral, and woodlands. Genetic and other analyses indicate that it is a species complex with ten subspecies which evolved as populations were isolated from each other. The complex includes subspecies previously considered separate species, such as the rare Tiburon jewelflower (ssp. niger) endemic to the San Francisco Bay Area. Plants in the complex are variable. In general they are annual herbs growing 10 centimeters to over a meter in height. They may be hairless to hairy to bristly. The ephemeral basal leaves have blades borne on winged petioles. Leaves higher on the stem are linear to lance-shaped and clasp the stem at their bases. Flowers occur at intervals along the upper stem. Each flower has an urn-shaped calyx of sepals one half to over one centimeter long which can be most any color from white to yellowish to pink or purple to nearly black. Purple, white, or purple-veined white petals emerge from the tip. The fruit is a straight or curving silique up to 11 centimeters long.

References

External links
Jepson Manual Treatment
Photo gallery

glandulosus
Flora of California
Flora of Oregon
Flora without expected TNC conservation status